The Triangle Rush Exhibition Hall is a gallery about rush in Yuanli Township, Miaoli County, Taiwan.

History
The gallery was established by the Farmers' Association of Yuanli Township by converting an idle warehouse of the association.

Architecture
The gallery spans over an area of 330 m2 and made from red bricks. It consists of the hat and mat culture area, exhibition area, rural ancient cultural relics display area, rice culture area and the folk culture area. It also features the hat and mat weaving demonstration zones and DIY classrooms.

See also
 List of museums in Taiwan

References

Buildings and structures in Miaoli County
Juncaceae
Tourist attractions in Miaoli County